{{Taxobox
| name = Ergalatax heptagonalis
| image =Naturalis Biodiversity Center - RMNH.MOL.198755 - Ergalatax heptagonalis (Reeve, 1846) - Muricidae - Mollusc shell.jpeg
| image_caption =
| regnum = Animalia
| phylum = Mollusca
| classis = Gastropoda
| unranked_superfamilia = clade Caenogastropodaclade Hypsogastropodaclade Neogastropoda
| superfamilia = Muricoidea
| familia = Muricidae
| subfamilia = Ergalataxinae
| genus = Ergalatax
| subgenus =
| species = E. heptagonalis
| binomial = Ergalatax heptagonalis
| binomial_authority = (Reeve, 1846)
| synonyms_ref = 
| synonyms = 
 Cronia heptagonalis (Reeve, 1846)
 Drupa ochrostoma heptagonalis (Reeve, 1846)
 Ricinula heptagonalis Reeve, 1846
 Ricinula ochrostoma heptagonalis (Reeve, 1846)
 Urosalpinx heptagonalis (Reeve, 1846)
}}Ergalatax heptagonalis'' is a species of sea snail, a marine gastropod mollusc in the family Muricidae, the murex snails or rock snails.

Description

Distribution

References

Ergalatax
Gastropods described in 1846